Despina Achladiotou, more commonly known as the Lady of Ro, was a Greek patriot who lived on the island of Ro; part of the small archipelago of Kastellórizo. She was notable for being the sole resident of the island, and for daily raising the Greek flag, from the time she arrived there until her death.

Biography
Despina Achladiotou was born on the island of Kastellorizo, in 1890. In 1927, she sailed with her husband, Kostas Achladiotis, to the nearby deserted island of Ro where they lived off of a few goats, chickens, and a vegetable garden. In 1940, her husband got sick, Achladiotou started three fires in order to inform the residents of Kastelorizo that they needed help, but her husband died on a boat which came to help. Achladiotou then brought her blind mother to the island, while later she personally rowed her mother's remains back to Kastellorizo for burial. She has been compared to Joan d'Arc and Boudica.

Achladiotou's most renowned deed is that every day she would fly a Greek flag over the island, even though the island was not formally part of Greece (as with the rest of the Dodecanese controlled by Italy) until 1948. During World War II, she helped the members of the Sacred Band against the Axis powers.

She raised the flag every day, regardless of the weather, from the time she arrived on the island until her death on May 13, 1982 at the age of 92. Despite not having veteran status, she was buried on the island with full military honors.

A Greek military unit is now based on the island, with the main duty of keeping the tradition of raising the flag.

References

External links

Videos 
 Interview of the Lady of RO - 1976

1890 births
1982 deaths
19th-century people from the Ottoman Empire
19th-century women from the Ottoman Empire
19th-century Greek people
20th-century Greek people
19th-century Greek women
20th-century Greek women
People from Kastellorizo
Greek hermits
Greeks from the Ottoman Empire
Greek Resistance members
Female resistance members of World War II
People from Ro, Greece